Corinne Heline (née Smith) (aka Corinne Dunklee, Corinne S. Dunklee, and Corinne S. Dunklee Heline) (August 18, 1882 in Atlanta, Georgia – July 26, 1975) was an American author, Christian mystic, and occultist who published 28 books.

Biography

Born to the well-to-do Duke family, part of the aristocracy of the Old South, she received a large inheritance at age 16 that allowed her to self-publish her works.

Corinne received a classical and religious education. She was a lifelong student of the ancient mysteries. Her first husband was Carl M. Dunklee (died before 1920), whom she married in Denver, Colorado on July 19, 1911. Her second husband was New Age pioneer Theodore Heline (John Theodore Heline) (August 14, 1883 - February 15, 1971), whom she met at Mount Ecclesia (headquarters of The Rosicrucian Fellowship in Oceanside, California), and whom she married sometime in the period 1940-1942. Rosicrucian initiate Max Heindel (pen-name of Carl Louis von Grasshoff) (1865-1919), founder of The Rosicrucian Fellowship, became her teacher at Mount Ecclesia. Theodore undertook the publication of her mystical and occult writings.

Her magnum opus, titled New Age Bible Interpretation (7 vols.) (1935-1961), was accompanied by many other works interpreting the ancient wisdom. She is known worldwide among students of esotericism and occultism, and also in New Age circles as a pioneer. She is credited as being one of the first occult writers to use the term "New Age" in the context used by the movement. Heline was an advocate of chromotherapy (colour healing) and authored two books on the topic, Healing and Regeneration Through Color (1943) and Color and Music in the New Age (1964).

Heline joined the New Age Bible and Philosophy Center at Santa Monica, California, which took the motto "Devoted to studies designed to aid the modern seeker to a spiritual reorientation in the Light of the Ancient Wisdom." Heline was a vegetarian. In 1948, she was a speaker at the Calgary Unit of the Canadian Vegetarian Association.

Writings

Magnum opus
New Age Bible Interpretation (1954)
Old Testament: Vol I Five Books of Moses and Joshua; Vol II Part I. Solomon and the Temple Builders – Part II. Books of Initiation; Vol III Part I. The Promise – Part II. The Preparation
New Testament: Vol IV Preparation for Coming of the Light of the World; Vol V The Christ and His Mission; Vol VI The Work of the Apostles and Paul and Book of Revelation (The Three Degrees of Discipleship ); Vol VII Mystery of the Christos (The Harp of David , The Twelve Holy Days)
Other books on Bible interpretation
Tarot and the Bible
Mythology and the Bible
Mystic Masonry and the Bible
Occult Anatomy and the Bible (New Birth Through Regeneration])
The Bible and the Stars
Sacred Science of Numbers
Questions and Answers on Bible Enigmas
Supreme Initiation of the Blessed Virgin
Blessed Virgin Mary, her Life & Mission
Other Books
Magic Gardens
Star Gates
Color & Music in the New Age
Music: The Keynote of Human Evolution
The Cosmic Harp; Healing; Regeneration through Color & Music
Esoteric Music of Richard Wagner
Beethoven's Nine Symphonies
The Twelve Labors of Hercules
Mysteries of the Holy Grail
Lenten Pearls
The Moon in Occult Lore
The Bible: Wonder Books of the Ages
Essays
The Language of Flowers – Peace: A Legend of the Golden Rod 
Songs of Initiation 
The Knights Templar 
The Symbolism of The Androgynous Man 
The White Rose – A Legend of Holy Night 
Zodiacal Signatures in the Ten Commandments 
Discipleship – The Five Followers: The Fellowship Degree 
Solomon – Revelations of Truth
The Autumn Equinox – Its Spiritual Significance

See also
Esoteric Christianity

Notes and references

External links

bioheline, biography in French language (contains a photo album)
Rosicrucian Fellowship catalog: Books by Corinne Heline
Rosicrucian Fellowship 
Official Website of The New Age Bible and Philosophy Center

1882 births
1975 deaths
19th-century Christian mystics
20th-century American philosophers
20th-century American women writers
American Christian mystics
American occultists
American spiritual writers
Christian occultists
Esotericists
New Age predecessors
New Age writers
People from Atlanta
Women mystics